Thomas Canynges (fl. 1450) was an English politician who served as Lord Mayor of London from 1456 to 1457.

Background
He was probably born in Bristol before 1399, in a wealthy family of merchants and cloth manufacturers in that city. He was the eldest of seven children of John Canynges, who died as a young man in 1405, by his wife Joan Wotton. One of Thomas's younger brothers was the great Bristol merchant William II Canynges (1474). Thomas's grandfather, William I Canynges (d.1396) was also a great Bristol merchant and was also 5 times Mayor of Bristol and 3 times MP for Bristol, in 1383, 1384 and 1386. His second son, John Canynges, the father of Thomas, was also prominent in Bristol civic life, serving twice as mayor and as MP for Bristol in 1383.

Career
Canyges was a member of the Worshipful Company of Grocers and became an Alderman for Aldgate ward in 1445. He was made Sheriff of London in 1449 and was elected Lord Mayor of London in 1456, his term ending in 1457. He was a Member of Parliament for City of London in 1459 as one of the two aldermanic representatives.

Death
His wife [?mother, wife of John Canynges?] Joan Wotton survived him and married secondly in about 1408 Thomas Young, twice mayor of Bristol, by whom she had two successful sons, John Young, Alderman of London, Grocer and Lord Mayor of London in 1466, and Thomas Young (d. 1476) a lawyer of the Middle Temple, Recorder of Bristol from 1441 and MP for Bristol almost continuously, with one break in 1453, between 1435 and 1455. Thomas Young before 1450 entered into the household of Richard, Duke of York (d. 1460), the Yorkist contender for heirship to the throne then occupied by Henry VI (1422-1461).

See also
 List of Sheriffs of the City of London
 List of Lord Mayors of London 
 City of London (elections to the Parliament of England)

Sources
Pryce, George. Memorials of the Canynges Family and their Times, Bristol, 1854
Oxford Dictionary of National Biography, 2004, Vol. 9, pp. 970–971

References

Further reading
Williams, E.E., The Chantries of William Canynges in St Mary Redcliffe, Bristol, with a Survey of Chantries in General and some Events in the Lives of the Canynges Family, 1950

Sheriffs of the City of London
Members of the Parliament of England for the City of London
English MPs 1459
15th-century lord mayors of London